Ukraine uses five-digit numeric postal codes that are written immediately to the right of the city or settlement name.

The codes are allocated to all settlements with a population of more than 500 irrespective of a post office presence; habitations with smaller population share a postal code of the closest code-marked settlement. All Ukraine Post Offices ("Ukrpost / Укрпошта") have post code books that may be purchased; alternatively, postal code for a given address can be found at a dedicated website. Postal codes of the territories occupied by Russian military forces (Crimean peninsula and parts of Donetsk and Luhansk oblast) remain included into Ukrainian national postal index as "postal offices temporarily out of service".

First two digits
First two digits of Ukrainian postal code can change from 01 to 99 ("00" combination isn't used at the first two positions) indicating national-level administrative units of state governance:
Kyiv – based on its size and capital status, postal codes starting with combinations 01-06 are assigned;
Oblasts – each of 24 oblasts is assigned several pairs of digits (2 to 6), where the smallest pair is used for postal encoding in the oblast's capital city;
Autonomous Republic of Crimea – the same postal code system as oblasts;
Sevastopol – city with special status of national-level governance, where postal codes begin with "99".

Furthermore, one pair of first two postal code digits ("50") is assigned to the city of Kryvyi Rih in Dnipropetrovsk Oblast as an exemption.

Example:

68 – Odesa Oblast, raions of south part.

Third digit
The third digit of Ukrainian postal code indicates lower level of administrative units: raions and towns of oblast-level subordination.

Examples:

683 – Odesa oblast, Kiliya raion;

680 – Odesa oblast, Chornomorsk (town of oblast-level subordination).

Fourth and fifth digit
These digits indicate numbers of individual post offices (or an individual settlement, if it has a single post office).

For central post offices of raions and of oblast-level subordination towns, the fourth and fifth digits are "00";

For indication of post offices in oblasts' capital cities, capital of the Autonomous Republic of Crimea, as well as in Kyiv and Sevastopol, postal code digits from third to fifth are used;

In case of the oblast's central post office (always located in the oblast's capital city), a postal code with "000" at positions 3-5 is used;

For indication of inter-raion communication centers, regional centers of mail collection and processing, railway post offices and other special post offices which are not associated with specific territory, digits "999" are used at positions 3-5 of postal code.

Examples:

65000 – Odesa city, oblast's central post office;

65029 – Odesa city, post office 29;

68300 – Odesa oblast, Kiliya raion, raion's central post office;

68355 – Odesa oblast, Kiliya raion, post office in town Vylkove.

See also

References

External links
 Ukrainian Postal Service postal codes directory (in Ukrainian)
 Other Ukrainian postal codes directory

Postal system of Ukraine
Ukraine